The Ukrainian Federation of Rugby League is the governing body for the sport of rugby league football in Ukraine. The Association was formed in 2008.

See also

 Rugby league in Ukraine
 Ukraine national rugby league team

References

External links

Rugby league in Ukraine
Rugby League
Rugby league governing bodies in Europe
Organizations established in 2008